Paul McGrady is a college athletics administrator and former American football coach.  He was the first head football coach at Southern Nazarene University in Bethany, Oklahoma, serving for six seasons, from 2000 to 2005, and compiling a record of 35–23.

References

External links
 Southern Nazarene profile

Year of birth missing (living people)
Living people
Southern Nazarene Crimson Storm football coaches